Lissia luehderi, or Luehder's recluse, is a species of butterfly in the family Hesperiidae. It is found in Sierra Leone, Ivory Coast, Ghana, Nigeria, Cameroon, the Democratic Republic of the Congo, Uganda, Kenya and Tanzania. The habitat consists of wetter forests.

Subspecies
Lissia luehderi luehderi (Sierra Leone, Ivory Coast, Ghana, Nigeria: Cross River loop, Cameroon, Democratic Republic of the Congo, western Uganda) 
Lissia luehderi laura Evans, 1937 (eastern Democratic Republic of the Congo, Uganda, western Kenya, north-western Tanzania)

References

Butterflies described in 1879
Hesperiinae
Butterflies of Africa